A tall tale is a story with unbelievable elements, related as if it were true and factual. Some tall tales are exaggerations of actual events, for example fish stories ("the fish that got away") such as, "That fish was so big, why I tell ya', it nearly sank the boat when I pulled it in!" Other tall tales are completely fictional tales set in a familiar setting, such as the European countryside, the American frontier, the Canadian Northwest, the Australian outback, or the beginning of the Industrial Revolution.

Events are often told in a way that makes the narrator seem to have been a part of the story; the tone is generally good-natured. Legends are differentiated from tall tales primarily by age; many legends exaggerate the exploits of their heroes, but in tall tales the exaggeration looms large, to the extent of dominating the story.

United States
The tall tale has become a fundamental element of  American folk literature. The tall tale's origins are seen in the bragging contests that often occurred when the rough men of the American frontier gathered. The tales of legendary figures of the Old West, some listed below, owe much to the style of tall tales.

The semi-annual speech-contests held by Toastmasters International public-speaking clubs may include a tall-tales contest. Each and every participating speaker is given three to five minutes to give a short speech of a tall-tale nature, and is then judged according to several factors. The winner proceeds to the next level of competition. The contest does not proceed beyond any participating district in the organization to the international level.

The comic strip  Non Sequitur (1992- ) sometimes features tall tales told by the character Captain Eddie; it is left up to the reader to decide if he is telling the truth, exaggerating a real event, or just telling a whopper.

About real people
Some stories are told about exaggerated versions of real people:
Johnny Appleseed – a friendly folk-hero who traveled the West planting apple trees because he felt his guardian angel told him to
Johnny Blood – an American football player whose reputation for wild behavior was as well known as his on-field play
Jim Bowie – A Kentuckian frontiersman, Texas Ranger, and land speculator who fought for the Texan cause in the Battle of the Alamo. He is known for the Bowie knife which he used to disembowel opponents.
Daniel Boone – blazed a trail across Cumberland Gap to found the first English-speaking colonies west of the Appalachian Mountains
Aylett C. "Strap" Buckner – an Indian fighter of colonial Texas
Davy Crockett – a  pioneer and U.S. Congressman from Tennessee who later died at the Battle of the Alamo
Mike Fink – the toughest boatman on the Ohio and Mississippi rivers, and a rival of Davy Crockett. Also known as the King of the Mississippi River Keelboatmen.
Peter Francisco – American Revolutionary War hero
John Henry – a mighty steel-driving African American
Calamity Jane – a tough Wild-West woman
Jigger Johnson (1871–1935), a lumberjack and log driver from Maine who is known for his numerous off-the-job exploits, such as catching bobcats alive with his bare hands, and drunken brawls
Casey Jones – a brave and gritty railroad engineer
Nat Love, also known as "Deadwood Dick", was born a slave in Tennessee in 1854. Tales of his adventures after emancipation, as a cowboy and as a Pullman porter, gained such fantastical elements as to be considered tall tales
Sam Patch – an early 19th-century daredevil who died during a jump on Friday the 13th
Molly Pitcher – a heroine of the American Revolutionary War
Blackbeard spawned various tall tales surrounding his involvement with piracy from 1717–1718

About imaginary people

Subjects of some American tall tales include legendary figures:
Tony Beaver – a West Virginia lumberjack and cousin of Paul Bunyan
Pecos Bill – legendary cowboy who "tamed the wild west"
Paul Bunyan – huge lumberjack who eats 50 pancakes in one minute, dug the Grand Canyon with his axe, made  Minnesota's 10,000 lakes with his footprints, and also has a blue ox named Babe who made the Mississippi River
Cordwood Pete – younger brother to lumberjack Paul Bunyan
Febold Feboldson – a Nebraska farmer who could fight a drought
Johnny Kaw, a fictional  Kansan whose mythological status itself was in one sense a figment, in that it was created recently, in 1955. Adherents of this assessment deem such stories fakelore.
Joe Magarac – a Pittsburgh steelworker made of steel
Alfred Bulltop Stormalong – an immense sailor whose ship was so big that it scraped the Moon

Australia
The Australian frontier (known as the bush or the outback) similarly inspired the types of tall tales that are found in American folklore. The Australian versions typically concern a mythical station called The Speewah. The heroes of the Speewah include:
Rodney Ansell 
Big Bill – The dumbest man on the Speewah who made his living cutting up mining shafts and selling them for post holes
Crooked Mick – A champion shearer who had colossal strength and quick wit.

Another folk hero is Charlie McKeahnie, the hero of Banjo Paterson's poem "The Man from Snowy River", whose bravery, adaptability, and risk-taking could epitomise the new Australian spirit.

Canada
The Canadian frontier has also inspired the types of tall tales that are found in American folklore, such as: 
French Canadian tales of Big Joe Mufferaw, a giant of a lumberjack and woodsman from the Ottawa Valley, loosely based on real-life lumberjack  Joseph Montferrand
Johnny Chinook, a Métis cowboy and rancher in Alberta.
Sam McGee, the hero of Robert Service's poem, "The Cremation of Sam McGee" (1907)

Europe
 
Some European tall tales include:
Toell the Great was one of the great tall tales of Estonia.
The Babin Republic, in Renaissance Poland (1568), was a satirical society dedicated entirely to mocking people and telling tall tales.
Juho Nätti (1890–1964), known as Nätti-Jussi, was a Finnish lumberjack known for telling tall tales; his stories have also circulated as folk tales and been collected in books.
The Life of Gargantua and of Pantagruel (16th century) by the French writer François Rabelais told the tale of two giants; father and son.
The many farfetched adventures of the fictional German nobleman Baron Munchausen, some of which may have had a folklore basis.
Legends of the Irish mythological hunter-warrior Fionn mac Cumhaill, also known as Finn MacCool, have it that he built the Giant's Causeway as stepping-stones to Scotland, so as not to get his feet wet, and that he also once scooped up part of Ireland to fling it at a rival, but it missed and landed in the Irish Sea; the clump became the Isle of Man, the pebble became Rockall, and the void became Lough Neagh.
Laughter and Grief by the White Sea, a Soviet film, depicts tall tales of the Pomors. A Pomor elder describes several stories, including a brown bear coating himself in baking soda to be acceptable to humans as a polar bear. 
The Cumbrian Liars, a United Kingdom association who follow in the seven-league footsteps of Will Ritson.
"The Irish Rover" is a well-known Irish folk song about an implausibly large sailing ship with a fanciful cargo.

In visual media

Early 20th-century postcards became a vehicle for tall tale telling in the US. Creators of these cards, such as the prolific Alfred Stanley Johnson Jr. and William H. "Dad" Martin, usually employed trick photography, including forced perspective, while others painted their unlikely tableaus, or used a combination of painting and photography in early examples of photo retouching. The common theme was gigantism: fishing for leviathans, hunting for or riding oversized animals, and bringing in the impossibly huge sheaves. An homage to the genre can be found on the cover of the Eat a Peach (1972) album by The Allman Brothers Band.

See also

Big Fish – Tim Burton movie relating the story of a dying man exaggerating the details of his life to his son 
Bill Brasky
Campfire story
Chuck Norris facts
Fairy tale
Folklore
Mythomania
Snipe hunt
The Most Interesting Man in the World
Unreliable narrator
Urban legend

References

Further reading
Brown, Carolyn. (1989). The Tall Tale in American Folklore and Literature. Knoxville, Tennessee: University of Tennessee Press. .

External links

American Tall Tales
Tall Tales, Whoppers and Lies – Audio Recording

 
American folklore
Australian folklore
Canadian folklore
English-language idioms